Rudolf Hieronymus Eusebius von Colloredo-Waldsee, born 2 November 1585 in České Budějovice, Kingdom of Bohemia (now in the Czech Republic), was a Bohemian nobleman and the brother of Hieronymus von Colloredo-Waldsee. A member of the Colloredo family, he distinguished himself in the Thirty Years' War, especially at the Battles of Mantua and Lützen.  Emperor Ferdinand III appointed him to the Imperial Privy Council and named him a Field Marshal. Although unable to prevent Prague Castle from falling to Sweden's Hans Christoff von Königsmarck, Colloredo-Waldsee's bold defense of Prague's old town halted the Swedish invasion of Bohemia on 26 July 1648 and saved the Habsburg's ancestral lands in Austria. After the war, he built the Schönborn Palace in Prague home to the United States Embassy to the Czech Republic. He died in Prague on 24 February 1657.

References

1585 births
1657 deaths
People from České Budějovice
People from the Kingdom of Bohemia
Bohemian nobility
Bohemian people of the Thirty Years' War
16th-century Bohemian people
Field marshals of the Holy Roman Empire
17th-century Bohemian people